IPAF  may refer to:
International Prize for Arabic Fiction
International Powered Access Federation